Thanyaburi is a municipality in central Thailand, in Pathum Thani Province, about 40 km north of Bangkok. Recent population estimates cited on the Internet range between 113,825 and 118,773.

 

Populated places in Pathum Thani province